Neocalyptis rotundata is a species of moth of the  family Tortricidae. It is found on Sumatra in Indonesia.

References

	

Moths described in 1941
Neocalyptis